Walter E. Piatt is a United States Army lieutenant general who currently serves as the 57th Director of the Army Staff.  He enlisted in the army in 1979 and served four years as an infantryman. After graduating from Lock Haven University, he was commissioned as a second lieutenant in 1987. Prior to assuming his current position Piatt was the Commanding General, 10th Mountain Division at Fort Drum. His other assignments as a general officer include serving as the 52nd Chief of Infantry; Deputy Commanding General-Support, 10th Mountain Division; Commander, Joint Multinational Training Command; Deputy Commanding General, United States Army Europe; and director of Operations/director, Rapid Equipment Fielding, Army Rapid Capabilities Office.

General Officer assignments

General Officer dates of rank

Attack on the United States Capitol
Prior to January 6, Pentagon officials repeatedly asked city and federal officials if they needed assistance from the D.C. National Guard, but only the Mayor of Washington, D.C. requested assistance of 340 unarmed service members. At approximately 2:20 p.m. on January 6, LTG Piatt joined a phone call with Washington, D.C. leaders, Capitol Police leaders, the D.C. National Guard and others as the violent attack on the capitol was unfolding. The Hill reported that Piatt said on the call that Secretary of the Army Ryan D. McCarthy was meeting with Secretary of Defense Christopher C. Miller to seek approval of the request for assistance. He also explained that he was not the decision maker and that no one was denying the request for assistance. The New York Times reported that during Congressional testimony February 23, 2021, former Capitol security leaders provided conflicting accounts of the request for the National Guard, reflecting the confusion of the event and the complexity of requesting Guard assistance.

On January 6, 2021, during the storming of the United States Capitol and an hour and a half after the west side defensive perimeter had been breached, according to Capitol Police Chief Steven Sund and DC National Guard leader Maj. Gen. William J. Walker, Piatt critically delayed or ignored Sund's request for National Guard support, stating, "I don't like the visual of the National Guard standing a police line with the Capitol in the background", despite this being a stark contrast to the protests of the previous year.  According to the Washington Post, “Piatt initially denied Sund's allegations in a statement but acknowledged in a call with reporters about two weeks later that he had conferred with others who were present that it was possible he made comments to that effect.”

On March 8, retired Army Lt. Gen Russel Honoré, whom House Speaker Nancy Pelosi (D-Calif.) tasked with leading the security review, identified that the U.S. Capitol Police are too “understaffed, insufficiently equipped, and inadequately trained” — and woefully lacking in intelligence capabilities. 

On June 15, 2021, Piatt told the House Committee on Oversight and Reform that Army officials “all immediately understood the gravity of the situation” after receiving a request in a conference call for “urgent and immediate support” at the Capitol, but that they still needed to develop a plan.  Piatt acknowledged that “those on the line were convinced that I was denying their request, despite [me] clearly stating three times that, 'We are not denying your requests. We need to prepare a plan for when the secretary of the Army gains approval….’”

On November 16, 2021, the Department of Defense Office of Inspector General released their findings on the actions that took place to prepare for and respond to protests at the U.S. Capitol. The report concluded that the actions the DoD took before January 6, 2021, to prepare for the planned protests in Washington, D.C., on January 5 and 6, 2021, were appropriate.

In early December 2021, Colonel Earl G. Matthews, a Trump appointee, released a rebuttal to the DoDIG report that accused LTG Piatt of making willful distortions of the events of January 6, describing Piatt and General Charles A. Flynn as "absolute and unmitigated liars" and of giving “perjured testimony before Congress”.

Fallout 
Piatt was once the leading candidate to take over as the commanding general of United States Army Futures Command, and appointment to the rank of general. He had received the recommendation from several top defense officials, however he was rejected by President Biden, due to his handling of National Guard deployment, during the January 6 attacks on the Capitol. He is scheduled to retire in the summer of 2023.

Mindfulness training
While a colonel (brigade commander, 25th Infantry Division) Piatt's unit had some 200 volunteers participate in a mindfulness study by Amishi Jha and Elizabeth Stanley in the 2010s; the Uniformed Services University of the Health Sciences notes that this mental practice "teaches the brain to stay 'in the moment'" which helps soldiers reduce the pain and stress of PTSD.

Awards and decorations

References

External links

Broncos Bid Farewell to Former Commander, Welcome Hawaiian Native, Staff Sgt. Amber Robinson, 3rd BCT Public Affairs Office, June 7, 2010.
Post hails new chief of Infantry, Vince Little, August 3, 2011.
Armor, Infantry chiefs depart, Vince Little, The Bayonet, June 27, 2012.
JMTC welcomes Brig. Gen. Piatt, Denver Beaulieu-Hains, Joint Multinational Training Command Public Affairs, June 27, 2013.
U.S. Army Europe welcomes new deputy commanding general, U.S. Army Europe Public Affairs, July 23, 2014.

United States Army personnel of the War in Afghanistan (2001–2021)
United States Army personnel of the Iraq War
Living people
Recipients of the Distinguished Service Medal (US Army)
Recipients of the Defense Superior Service Medal
Recipients of the Legion of Merit
United States Army generals
Lock Haven University of Pennsylvania alumni
1958 births